The 2003–04 season was Colchester United's 62nd season in their history and their sixth successive season in the third tier of English football, the Second Division. Alongside competing in the Second Division, the club also participated in the FA Cup, the League Cup and the Football League Trophy.

Colchester embarked on cup runs in the FA Cup, reaching the fifth round where they were eliminated by Sheffield United, while they also were one fixture away from a trip to the Millennium Stadium in the Football League Trophy after falling to a 4–3 aggregate defeat to Southend United. The U's cup exploits eventually led to a late season drop in form, as they slipped from 5th position to 14th with fixture congestion. They recovered to finished 11th, nine points away from the play-offs.

Season overview
Phil Parkinson embarked on his first full season in charge by applying what he had learnt from the final few months of the previous campaign, while gaining his UEFA A Licence and UEFA B Licence as well as a degree he studied for in his spare time. He introduced sports science to the club, revolutionising the way players trained, ate and rested.

The U's participated in a record 15 cup ties during the season, making significant progress in the FA Cup and Football League Trophy. Helped by the astute signings of Wayne Andrews and Premier League youngsters Craig Fagan and Rowan Vine, Colchester reached the FA Cup fifth round, defeating Oxford United, Aldershot Town, Accrington Stanley, and Coventry City, courtesy of a Vine hat-trick, before succumbing to Sheffield United 1–0 at Bramall Lane. Two days after the FA Cup clash, the U's were faced with the task of overcoming a Football League Trophy southern section final first-leg 3–2 deficit against Southend United. The match ended 1–1, with former U's manager Steve Wignall's Southend progressing. Fixture congestion was a contributing factor in Colchester's slip down the table from 5th position to 14th, while losing Karl Duguid to a serious knee injury.

At the end of the season, Colchester completed the campaign in eleventh position, nine points adrift of the play-off places.

Players

Transfers

In

 Total spending:  ~ £0

Out

 Total incoming:  ~ £0

Loans in

Loans out

Match details

Second Division

League table

Results round by round

Matches

Football League Cup

Football League Trophy

FA Cup

Squad statistics

Appearances and goals

|-
!colspan="16"|Players who appeared for Colchester who left during the season

|}

Goalscorers

Disciplinary record

Clean sheets
Number of games goalkeepers kept a clean sheet.

Player debuts
Players making their first-team Colchester United debut in a fully competitive match.

See also
List of Colchester United F.C. seasons

References

General
Books

Websites

Specific

2003-04
2003–04 Football League Second Division by team